Love in Flight (Spanish: Amor en el aire) is a 1967  romantic comedy film, a co-production between Spain and Argentina  directed and written by Luis César Amadori with Jesús María de Arozamena.

Release
The film premiered in Spain on 25 December 1967 and in Argentina on 29 August 1968.

Cast
 Rocío Dúrcal
 Palito Ortega
 Amalia de Isaura
 Rafael Alcántara
 Manuel Alexandre
 Rafaela Aparicio
José María Labernié
José Luis López Vázquez
Erasmo Pascual
 Fernando Rey
Elio Roca

External links 
 

1967 films
1960s Spanish-language films
1967 romantic comedy films
Films directed by Luis César Amadori
Spanish aviation films
Argentine romantic comedy films
1960s Argentine films
1960s Spanish films